Idou may refer to the following:

 Sony Ericsson Satio
 Ido (name)#Surname another transliteration of the Japanese surname Idō